"30 Seconds Over Tokyo" is the debut single by American post-punk band Pere Ubu. It was written by David Thomas, Peter Laughner and Gene O'Connor, during their stint as members of Rocket from the Tombs in 1974. Released on Thomas' independent Hearthan Records in 1975, the song received very little airplay but has earned high praise in the years since.

Background and composition
The song's lyrics are based on the Doolittle Raid of 1942, as told from the perspective of a pilot on a suicide mission. Its title was borrowed from the 1943 book Thirty Seconds Over Tokyo by Captain Ted W. Lawson, adapted to a major motion picture of the same name in 1944. According to Rocket from the Tombs bassist Craig Bell, the genesis of the song was a riff written by guitarist Gene "Cheetah" O'Connor, to which fellow guitarist Peter Laughner provided a corresponding riff, while David Thomas penned the lyrics. Thomas, who refers to it as a pop song, said that "30 Seconds" was "probably the last time I ever wrote in a straight narrative form". Writing in the book Rip It Up and Start Again, a chronicle of the post-punk genre, Simon Reynolds called it "almost prog in its structural strangeness", with its introduction section "like some loping, rhythmically sprained hybrid of Black Sabbath and reggae".

Songwriting credits for "30 Seconds" belong to Thomas, Laughner and O'Connor, who wrote and performed it during their stint as members of the short-lived Cleveland-based garage rock band Rocket from the Tombs. The band broke up after supporting Television's first gig outside New York City, at the Piccadilly Inn in Cleveland. Recordings from this set were released as The Day the Earth Met Rocket from the Tombs in 2002, a double album; the first disc of which includes a demo of "30 Seconds" performed by RFTT at their home studio in February 1975. Bell attributed the breakup of RFTT to youthful frustration and the lack of a peacemaker-type role in the band. Thomas said he was not a forward-thinking person at the time but were proud of their songs performed as RFTT and wanted to preserve them in a permanent medium. He proposed founding Pere Ubu to Laughner in 1975, with the intention of being a studio-only band for the purpose of recording one single before disbanding. Laughner liked the idea and added synth player Allen Ravenstine, guitarist Tom Herman and drummer Scott Krauss to the band—musicians he had lived with at the Plaza, an apartment building owned by Ravenstine where they performed experimental music on synths and tape recorders.

Recording
While rehearsal of the song took three days, "30 Seconds Over Tokyo", which clocks in at over six minutes, was recorded and mixed in one night at Audio Recording in Cleveland. Another RFTT staple, "Final Solution" was supposed to be the single's B-side. However, "Heart of Darkness" emerged from a jam during the rehearsal for "30 Seconds", which the members preferred as more unique, and so dropped "Final Solution", which would later be the band's second single in 1976. Ravenstine's synth of choice of the record was a EML ElectroComp 200. Herman found Ravenstine's synth playing underappreciated, calling his style different from other bands of the era that used synths, in that it "pushed the energy level higher" rather than adding ambience to the mix. Ravenstine, who became an airline pilot after leaving Pere Ubu in the 1980s, used the ElectroComp 200 to emulate the sound of large "rotary engines" (Ravenstine's words; the engines being discussed were actually non-rotating radial engines) used in planes during World War II, as well as the static-laden radio transmission at the end.

"30 Seconds" employed three guitarists. Herman played rhythm guitar filtered through a Morley wah-wah pedal throughout, while Wright and Laughner played bass during different sections of the song: Wright performing through the more melodic sections and Laughner during the noisier parts. Wright also played guitar in overdubs. All members perform during the free-improvisation noise sections, which Herman described as "every man for himself". The amplifier borrowed from the studio was malfunctioning, which resulted in an unusual "neat squishy break-up". The song ends abruptly with a flurry of Ravenstine's emulated radio static. According to Krauss, engineer Bill Cavanaugh clashed with the band over their creative decisions, especially Ravenstine and his synths, and tried putting Krauss's cymbals through a harmonizer, which he vetoed. The pressing plant to which the final mix was delivered worriedly called up the band by telephone, informing them that the pressed singles were compromised with excess noise. Cavanaugh compared one of these pressings to the master tape and found that it sounded identical.

Release and reception
"30 Seconds Over Tokyo" was released in December 1975 on Hearthan Records, an independent record label owned by Thomas. Though the single was pressed in great quantity, Thomas thought it would sell poorly and receive almost no radio play. He held a romantic notion of excess stock of the single trickling into thrift stores such as Salvation Army, where it would be rediscovered by a curious teenager who would be impressed by the performances and the would-be ephemerality of the band. However, the single sold better than anticipated, especially in Minneapolis and abroad in London and Paris. Thomas discussed the future of Pere Ubu with his bandmates at the Plaza, where they decided to keep the band active for the foreseeable future. Laughner was fired in 1976 for showing up drunk to subsequent recording sessions, however. He joined the writing staff of Creem alongside Lester Bangs but succumbed to acute pancreatitis in 1977, caused by his drug and alcohol abuse.

"30 Seconds Over Tokyo" has since been recognized as a landmark proto-punk release, with Uncut writer Tom Pinnock defining it as "post-punk before its time". Reviewing the single in 1978, Tim Lott of Record Mirror called its gloomy vibe "more realistic" than the "death-and-destruction heavy metal crap pumped out by the likes of Judas Priest", its genre straddling between avant-garde and gothic rock, the "A-bomb overtones" "thoughtfully conceived" and the final section "". Steve Huey of AllMusic wrote that the song's "lurching guitar riffs and cacophonous noise are a perfect match for singer David Thomas' apocalyptic visions". Mojo called "30 Seconds" and its succeeding single "Final Solution" both "stunning". Music writer Steve Taylor called the 1975 Rocket from the Tombs recording "addictive", comparing it to Pink Floyd's "Interstellar Overdrive". When Rocket from the Tombs reformed in 2003, Thomas and company re-recorded "30 Seconds Over Tokyo" in a heavier style than the original.

The single was re-released on Record Store Day 2016 by Fire Records in the United Kingdom, limited to 1,000 copies.

Personnel
 Pere Ubu
 David Thomas (as Crocus Behemoth) – vocals
 Tom Herman – rhythm guitar
 Peter Laughner – guitar, bass
 Tim Wright – guitar, bass
 Scott Krauss – drums
 Allen Ravenstine – synthesizer

 Technical staff
 Bill Cavanaugh – engineer, mixer
 Jon Luoma – cover art
 Tim Ernst – "necessary assistance"
 Marianne Livchak – management

Citations

References

 
 
 
 
 
 
 
 
 
 
 

1975 songs
1975 debut singles
Pere Ubu songs
Protopunk songs
Songs about Tokyo
Songs about World War II